Ninon Dubois Le Clerc or Ninon Leclaire (1750 in France - 4 May 1779, Stockholm), was a French ballerina and courtesan. She was a member of the Royal Swedish Ballet and regarded as one of the stars of the royal ballet during her career there. As a courtesan she was known for her relationship with the Russian ambassador Ivan Simolin and the poet Johan Henric Kellgren, who wrote a poem in lamentation over her death in consumption.

Sources 
 Gunilla Roempke (1994): Vristens makt – dansös i mätressernas tidevarv. Stockholm: Stockholm Fischer & Co. 
 Carl Forsstrand (1911): Sophie Hagman och hennes samtida. Några anteckningar från det gustavianska Stockholm. Andra Upplagan. Wahlström & Widstrand, Stockholm
 Anna Ivarsdotter Johnsson, Leif Jonsson: Musiken i Sverige. Frihetstiden och Gustaviansk tid 1720-1810
 Klas Ralf (1973): Operan 200 år. Jubelboken. Prisma

18th-century French ballet dancers
18th-century Swedish ballet dancers
Royal Swedish Ballet dancers
1750 births
1779 deaths
French courtesans
Gustavian era people